Student League for Industrial Democracy may refer to two organizations, both student affiliates of the adult League for Industrial Democracy:

Student League for Industrial Democracy (1930s), which changed its name to Intercollegiate League for Industrial Democracy, and which merged into the American Student Union in 1935
Student League for Industrial Democracy (1946-1959), which subsequently changed its name to the Students for a Democratic Society